Carles Planas Antolínez (born 4 March 1991) is a Spanish professional footballer who plays as a left-back.

Club career

Barcelona
Born in Sant Celoni, Barcelona, Catalonia, Planas started playing football for his hometown club, moving to FC Barcelona's youth academy, La Masia, at age 9. After progressing through its ranks he was promoted to the reserves in 2009, going on to spend several seasons in the Segunda División with them.

In late November/early December 2012, Planas played his first two competitive games with the first team: he made his debut in a 3–1 home win over Deportivo Alavés in the round of 32 of the Copa del Rey (6–1 on aggregate), featuring the last 20 minutes of the match in the place of Adriano. The following week, as the Blaugrana were already qualified as first in their UEFA Champions League group, he started against S.L. Benfica in a 0–0 draw, also at the Camp Nou.

Celta
On 5 June 2014, Planas was released by Barcelona, but on the same day he joined RC Celta de Vigo on a three-year deal. He made his La Liga debut on 24 August, playing the entirety of the 3–1 home victory over Getafe CF.

Planas' contract was not extended at the end of the 2016–17 campaign, and he left Balaídos after having made 59 appearances across all competitions.

Girona
On 13 July 2017, free agent Planas signed a three-year contract with newly-promoted Girona FC. He spent the better part of his first season dealing with injury problems.

On 22 August 2019, after suffering relegation, Planas severed ties with the club.

Club statistics

References

External links
FC Barcelona official profile

1991 births
Living people
People from Vallès Oriental
Sportspeople from the Province of Barcelona
Spanish footballers
Footballers from Catalonia
Association football defenders
La Liga players
Segunda División players
Segunda División B players
FC Barcelona Atlètic players
FC Barcelona players
RC Celta de Vigo players
Girona FC players
Cypriot First Division players
AEK Larnaca FC players
Spain youth international footballers
Spain under-21 international footballers
Spanish expatriate footballers
Expatriate footballers in Cyprus
Spanish expatriate sportspeople in Cyprus